"Love Shot" is a song by South Korean–Chinese boy band Exo, released on December 13, 2018, for the repackaged edition of the group's fifth studio album Love Shot (2018). The music video was released on the same date.

Background and composition 
Produced by Rice N' Peas, "Love Shot" is described as a pop dance track that features a memorably addictive chorus and heavy 808 bass. Members Chen and Chanyeol participated in writing the lyrics that talk about hoping to be together and rediscover the meaning of true love, which seems to be disappearing more and more from a dreary world.

Talking to Billboard about co-composing the song, Mike Woods stated that the song was created in January 2017, and stated that him and the other composers MZMC, Bazzi, Kevin White and Anthony Russo, "wanted something that was very, very performance-driven, very dance-driven — something that would sound good loud and in an arena. We like the fact that it's kind of in a different time signature — it's in 6/8, so that's not like a generic pop song.", Woods also stated that the original title of the song is "Love Shop". Despite comments by Woods that the song is in 6/8 time signature, this track makes use of 4/4 timing at the tempo of 72BPM. It is in the key of C minor. Both the instrumental and vocal melodies feature the use of sixteenth note triplet rhythms.

Music video
On December 6, the first teaser of "Love Shot" music video was released. On December 11, the second teaser of "Love Shot" music video was released. The official Korean music video of "Love Shot" was released on December 13. The Chinese version of the music video was released on December 14.

The music video shows the members switching places between the gritty locale of a gas station and luxurious trappings, before participating in a shoot-out with unexpected enemies. The video also shows the group's sensual choreography.

On March 4, 2019, the Korean music video surpassed 100 million views on YouTube. It surpassed 200 and 300 million views on October 15, 2019, and August 18, 2020, respectively, becoming their fastest music video to reach all three milestones.

Promotion
Exo began promoting "Love Shot" without member Lay on South Korean music shows starting from December 14.

Reception 
"Love Shot" topped Billboards World Digital Songs for three consecutive weeks, making Exo the second K-pop act to do so. British fashion magazine i-D ranked the song number seven in their list of K-pop highlights of the year while SBS PopAsia ranked it the 18th best K-pop dance of 2018.

Accolades

Charts

Weekly charts

Year-end charts

Sales

References

2018 singles
2018 songs
Exo songs
Korean-language songs
SM Entertainment singles
Billboard Korea K-Pop number-one singles
Future bass songs